Musa Juma Mumbo (December 6, 1968 – March 15, 2011) was a rumba and Benga musician from Kenya. He was born to the second wife of his father, a policeman, and  into a family of 18 children. He grew up in Homabay where he attended primary and secondary schools. He began singing and playing instruments at a young age. His first instruments were guitars and drums made from tins and strings. He was the bandleader, guitarist and composer for Orchestra Limpopo International. Most of his music was sung in Dholuo language. Some of his songs are a fusion of the Luo and Congolese musical styles. He also sang in Kiswahili and English. 

He was born in Usonga, Siaya District (now Siaya County). Juma (or MJ as he was popularly referred to) ventured into music immediately after completing high school. It was a difficult decision because music was not paying in the 1980s in Kenya and it was not considered as a career. However, Musa's determination could not be stopped by the societal view of music and he pursued his talents and interests. After a long struggle, MJ and his brother Omondi Tony (Anthony Omondi Mumbo) launched their band, Orchestra Limpopo International. Together they started playing rumba in small clubs in Nairobi and Kisumu. Their performances and compositions saw Orchestra Limpopo International gradually rise into national fame. Years later, the two brothers would separate and Omondi Tony turned to a solo career. Juma thrilled his fans with rumba style music laced with Congolese styles. 

Musa Juma identified and signed top talent s into his band making it a great group. He had singers and guitarists from Congo, Tanzania, and Kenya. Some of the famous members of Orchestra Limpopo International band that are having a glistering career are John Junior and Prezda Igwe Bandason.

Some of the most popular songs by Musa Juma were "Hera Mudho", "Ufisadi", "Mercelina", and "Freddy". He released eight albums, the last of them being titled Lake Victoria.

During his career he toured various countries. Only weeks before his death in 2011, he and his band had a tour in the United States. 

He died of pneumonia on March 15, 2011 at Mombasa Hospital. He was survived by his wife, Winnie and a young daughter, Vicky.

References

External links 
Musa Juma

Kenyan musicians
1968 births
2011 deaths
Deaths from pneumonia in Kenya
People from Siaya County
Soukous musicians